Phallostethus cuulong is a species of  fish in the family Phallostethidae. It was discovered in 2009 and described in 2012. Males have their gonads under the chin – along with a serrated saw and rod for grasping females.<ref name="Shibukawa et al. 2012"></ref> The name cuulong is from the Vietnamese name of the river system where they are found, Cửu Long River''.

References

External links
 Un poisson qui porte ses organes génitaux sous la tête', in French: YouTube
 Zoologger: The fish with its genitals on its head Michael Marshall, New Scientist, 17:35 5/7/2012
 The fish with its genitals on its head 11/7/2012, 17:35: NewScientist
 

cuulong
2012 in Vietnam
Fish described in 2012
Mekong Delta
Fish of the Mekong Basin
Fish of Vietnam
Endemic fauna of Vietnam